Samaya is a Buddhist order as part of the Abhiseka ceremony of empowerment.

Samaya may also refer to:
 
 a common alternative spelling of Samayah, a town in Guinea
 Samaya (film), a 1975 Indian Oriya film
 Samaya Vudhirodom (1888–1889), Prince of Siam
 Samaya TV, the first Kannada News Channel owned by a Kannadiga
 Sāmāyika, a Jain meditation practice
 HD 205739 (star), constellation Piscis Austrinus; named for the Sinhalese word for peace; aka CD−32° 16667, HIP 106824
 Samaya (album), an album by Bipul Chettri

See also

 Peace (disambiguation)